The North Washington Street Historic District is a residential historic district in Hope, Arkansas.  It consists of a group of six houses along the west side of North Washington Street, between B and E Streets, representing the best cluster of well-preserved houses from Hope's second period of residential expansion, between 1900 and 1945.  The six houses (220, 316, 320, 402, and 416 North Washington and 704 Pond Street) are architecturally diverse: two of them are Folk Victorian wood-frame houses, two are Prairie style brick buildings, and the other two are Colonial and Craftsman in style.  These house are set on larger house lots than those found in the North Elm Street Historic District, part of Hope's original platting which features some older houses and generally smaller lot sizes.

The district was listed on the National Register of Historic Places in 1995.

See also
National Register of Historic Places listings in Hempstead County, Arkansas

References

Historic districts on the National Register of Historic Places in Arkansas
Colonial Revival architecture in Arkansas
Prairie School architecture in Arkansas
Buildings and structures completed in 1900
Hempstead County, Arkansas
National Register of Historic Places in Hempstead County, Arkansas